Haberman was a station along the Long Island Rail Road's Lower Montauk Branch that was located at the intersection of Rust Street and 50th Street in Maspeth, Queens. The station is named after the Haberman Steel Enamel Works in Berlin Village. 

Haberman opened as a station for the convenience of workmen in September 1892; service was furnished by the Long Island City-East New York Rapid Transit trains. There never was a station building. The station still had manual railroad crossing gates and a guard shack as recently as 1973. It was closed on March 16, 1998 along with Penny Bridge, Fresh Pond, Glendale and Richmond Hill stations; average daily westbound ridership at the station in 1997 was 3. In January 2018, Haberman was one of 8 stations on the Lower Montauk Branch that were considered for reopening in a study sponsored by the New York City Department of Transportation.

On some maps, Haberman mistakenly appears as the name of the neighborhood which the station was located, which on maps was referred to an industrialized area of Maspeth bounded by Grand Avenue to the south, 56th Road to the east, the Kosciusko Bridge carrying the Brooklyn Queens Expressway to the north and the Newtown Creek to the west.

References

External links
Unofficial LIRR History Website
Images of remains of former Haberman Station

Former Long Island Rail Road stations in New York City
Railway stations in Queens, New York
Railway stations in the United States opened in 1892
Railway stations closed in 1998
1892 establishments in New York (state)
1998 disestablishments in New York (state)
Maspeth, Queens